Theo Pirmez (13 June 1915 – 9 April 1990) was a Belgian racing cyclist. He rode in the 1938 Tour de France.

References

1915 births
1990 deaths
Belgian male cyclists
Place of birth missing